The Richard E. Martin House, also known as Castlewood, is a historic mansion in Forest Hills, Tennessee. It was built in 1931 for Richard E. Martin.

It was designed in the Tudor Revival architectural style by architects Warfield & Keeble.  Keeble himself lived in the Forest Hills neighborhood. It has been listed on the National Register of Historic Places since October 27, 2003.

References

Houses on the National Register of Historic Places in Tennessee
Tudor Revival architecture in the United States
Houses completed in 1931
Buildings and structures in Davidson County, Tennessee